Christopher Francis Reilly (born in Glasgow, Scotland) is a Scottish actor.

Career
Chris Reilly began acting in 2009 age 31, and studied at Royal Welsh College of Music and Drama with a Screen Academy Wales Bursary.

Most Recent Work:
"Wrath of Man" for MGM and Miramax.
"The Head" for HBO Asia and Hulu Japan, filming in Tenerife and Iceland, a thriller set in an Arctic ice station.
"Industry" for HBO 
"Cash Truck" for Miramax/MGM and Guy Ritchie alongside Jason Statham, Scott Eastwood, Jeffrey Donovan and Laz Alonso.

Chris Reilly is the 2018 BAFTA Scotland Winner for Best Actor in a Television Drama for his Role as Alex Baxter in BBC1's "The Last Post". He starred alongside Jessie Buckley, Jessica Raine, Ben Miles, Tom Glyn Carney and Stephen Campbell Moore. In accepting his award he called for focus on industry access for working class young people, having benefited himself from a Screen Academy Wales (sponsored by BAFTA Cymru) bursary while at Welsh College. He dedicated his award to Marilyn Le Conte, Head of Radio Drama at RWCMD.

Throughout 2018 Chris was working on The Feed for Amazon Prime Filming in Manchester and Liverpool. He is Lead cast as Gil Tomine, Also Cast are David Thewlis and Michelle Fairley, and is filming "Devils" in Rome for Sky Italia and Lux Vide playing Alex Vance with Patrick Dempsey.

Chris Reilly is also billed as lead cast in BANG! (BBC3 and S4C) He plays Ray in an English/Welsh language drama in the Scandi Noir style, Written by Roger Williams. The show has won multiple awards including Best Drama and Best Editor in the 2018 BAFTA Cymru (Wales) awards. The Cast Includes Jack Parry-Jones who won Best Actor in a Film at the same awards for his role in Moon Dogs. Chris Reilly is currently working with the same production team on "Concrete Plans", Billed as a Neo-Western Set in the Wild West Wales.

Chris Reilly is only actor to play more than one scripted role in Game of Thrones. He is credited in S2E10 as Soldier Tom and S4E01 as Morgan Lanister.

Early in his filmography, Chris Reilly had second billing behind Julian Ovenden in his first feature British Independent film Allies (2014) by Happy Hour Films – a Bristol-based production company and distributed in the UK and the US (February 2015) By EOne, and a supporting role in Working Title's studio film Everest (2015), as Klev Schoening, alongside Jake Gyllenhaal and Keira Knightley in the true story of the 1996 Mount Everest disaster (Klev was the nephew of mountaineer Pete Schoening).

In theatre, Chris has appeared in works at Shakespeare's Globe, The National Theatre of Scotland, The Royal Court, Hampstead Theatre, Sheffield Theatre, Everyman Liverpool and Piccolo Teatro - Milan.

Before he began his professional career, at the age of 31 he ran a homeless service in Glasgow.

Filmography

Film

Television

References

External links
Chris Reilly's Spotlight profile

Chris Reilly at the Royal Welsh College of Music and Drama
Chris Reilly website

Living people
Scottish male film actors
Scottish male television actors
British male film actors
21st-century British male actors
21st-century Scottish male actors
Year of birth missing (living people)